The 1927 CCNY Lavender football team was an American football team that represented the City College of New York (CCNY) as an independent during the 1927 college football season. In their fourth season under Harold J. Parker, the Lavender team compiled a 4–2–2 record.

Schedule

References

CCNY
CCNY Beavers football seasons
CCNY Lavender football